Gerda Alexander (February 15, 1908 – February 21, 1994) was a German / Danish teacher who developed a "bodymind technique" or "somatic practice" known as Eutony. As a young woman, Gerda was in contact with the vanguards of the arts, education, and movement culture in the early 20th century. From the 30's on, she started to develop her innovative method through her studies between movement and musicality, new pedagogies and neurosciences. Through Eutony, she collaborated with many medical centers, pedagogical institutions, and artistic training in Europe, North and South America and the Middle East.

Gerda Alexander was a pioneer among the creators of somatic education practices in the world. Her school in Copenhagen trained professionals for 45 years.

Life and work 

Gerda Alexander was born in Wuppertal, Germany and her parents were enthusiasts of Dalcroze Eurhythmics, passing on to her a similar interest in arts and movement.

Gerda was born under the influence of Émile-Jaques Dalcroze in Germany. Gerda mentions that the "first contact [she] had with Dalcroze's work was some photographs from the first festival in Hellerau in 1911". She enrolled in the school of Otto Blensdorf (the Blensdorfschüle) in Wuppertal-Elberfeld and became an active assistant of the activities of the school. In 1926, Charlotte Blensdorf (Otto's daughter) was invited to teach Rhythmic Education for children and teachers at the first Institute for Scientific Pedagogical Research under the leadership of Peter Petersen, internationally known for the Jena-Plan, a postgraduate preparation for teachers in free schools. Gerda worked as Charlotte's assistant in this project and completed a year of practical work at Stradtroda, an institution of the State of Thüringen for all kinds of disturbed children and young people up to the age of 21, including criminal cases. About this work, Gerda says that she "have never since learned so much in pedagogy as during that year".

Gerda was graduated in the Hochschule für Musik in Berlin in 1929. During this period, Dalcroze Eurhythmics was taught in all large universities and music schools in Germany.

From her 16 years old, Gerda had several severe attacks of rheumatic fever, followed by heart diseases and a endocarditis, which hindered her mobility. She was hospitalized many times and had to find ways to move that would not overload her circulatory system. By her own difficulties, the ongoing reflections with her students of all ages and an enthusiastic inquiry about artistic development, she started to research new ways of moving. In her own words: "I tried to find out how I could develop every person's own expression without programming him/her. At the same time, there was my personal need to learn how to survive".

With an invitation to assit Otto and Charlotte Blensdorf at the Fifth Congress of the New Education Fellowship in 1929, and subsequently to teach between Denmark and Sweden, Gerda moved to Copenhagen, Denmark. As soon as Hitler came to power in Germany, she decided to stay. Gerda Alexander lived in Copenhagen almost all her life.

In 1959, Gerda Alexander was responsible for the "First International Congress for Release of Tension and Functional Movement" in Copenhagen with the support of the Danish Ministry of Education. On this event, she gathered many psychosomatic researchers and methods creators (methods later denominated as "somatic practices" or "somatic education techniques").

Gerda worked regularly in partnership with institutions like: Fröbel Schools, Philharmonie Malmö, Private Theater School, the Royal Theatre Copenhagen, the Theater Academy, Danish Broadcasting House (orchestra, choir and staff), Royal Music Conservatory, Danmarks Lærerhøjskole (Teacher training college - Department of music), Rigshospital, Dalcroze Societies, CEMEA - Centres d'Entrainement aux Méthodes d'Education Active, and others. She gave lectures and workshops in Danmark, Sweden, Norway, France, Austria, Germany, Switzerland, USA, Israel, Greece, Italy, Holland, Mexico, Venezuela, Belgium and Argentina.

Gerda Alexander died six days after her 86th birthday in Wuppertal, where she lived in her old age. Her students today continue her work in several places in the world.

Historical Influences 

These were the main historical influences on Gerda's work, according to Jean-Marie Huberty:

 François Delsarte
 Elsa Gindler
 Bildungsanstalt Jacques Dalcroze in Hellerau - today HELLERAU – Europäisches Zentrum der Künste
 Ausdruckstanz
 Rosalia Chladek
 Schlaffhorst-Andersen Schule Atem-Stimme und Bewegung - today CJD Schule Schlaffhorst-Andersen Bad Nenndorf
 Stanislavski Method, via Marussia Bergh
 Eurythmy 
 Jena Plan

Eutony 
Through her pedagogical practices, and the ongoing researches with her own physical limitations due to endocarditis, Gerda Alexander found ways of somatically modulate and regulate neuromuscular tone, what was confirmed later with the discovery of Gama System.  The word "eutony" (from Greek Eu: good - and Latin Tonus: tension, the grade of tension or elasticity of muscle fibers) was coined with the help of the Dr. med. Alfred Bartussek to express the idea of a harmoniously balanced "tonicity in constant adaptation to the state or activity of the moment". According to Gerda Alexander, "we use high tonus for effort, and medium tonus or low tonus for rest and sleep. In Eutony, we learn to use the best tonus for the action in question."

In the development of Eutony, Gerda Alexander was deeply concerned with a pedagogical approach that could support the experience of tonus modulation by the person's own experience as a living body. Eutony is based in a student-centered learning process, where sensorial experience and critical reflection are the basis for learning. She postulated that "it is important, in treatment, not to give and do more than is necessary, so that the other can rely on himself. It is not that I am a great master who gives you help. Rather, I can introduce you to my work for your own self-discovery." The processes iniciated by her classes were reported by her students, recognizing benefits in their psychic well-being and in their daily life, and Gerda began to receive medical referrals and make partnerships with medical centers, treating patients that “specialists could not give any hope of improvement" as paraplegic, spastic, amputees, with psychosomatic cases, among others. Scientific theories came a posteriori to support her practices, specially with the discovery of Gama System, as she describes "from that time, new finding in neurophysiology have become an important support of our work, and our practical discoveries can be explained step by step".

The Gerda Alexander School 
Gerda Alexander opened a school in Copenhagen in 1939 by the name of "Gerda Alexander Skolen". The professional training in Eutony includes subjects as: Eutony (practice and theory, pedagogy and therapy), speech training, psychology, anatomy, physiology, neurology, neurophysiology, neuropathology, psychiatry and visiting seminars form specialists about current development in neurophysiology and other relevant disciplines.

In 1957, the school got state technical college recognition, with a three to four years training with diploma.

The school was officially closed in 1985 by the name of "International Centre of Eutonia".

Active schools of Eutony professional training 

 Argentina: Asociación Argentina y Latinoamericana de Eutonía (AALE)
 Austria: Eutonie-Akademie
 Belgium: L’Ecole Belge d’Eutonie Gerda Alexander (EBEGA)
 Brazil: Instituto Brasileiro de Eutonia
 France: L’Ecole Française d’Eutonie Gerda Alexander (EFEGA)
 Germany: Eutonie-Akademi Bremen
 Germany: EUTONIE INSTITUT Barbara Franco Palacio
 Switzerland: Eutonie Zentrum Schweiz

Gerda's book and translations 

 - edited and supplemented by Karin Schaefer

References

Further reading

External links
Original photos: Gerda Alexander (Danish or German subtitles)

Danish philosophers
Danish schoolteachers
People in alternative medicine
1908 births
1994 deaths
Exercise instructors
Mind–body interventions
Danish women philosophers
20th-century Danish women educators
Danish psychologists
Danish women psychologists
Dance therapists
Somatic therapists
20th-century psychologists
20th-century Danish philosophers